Kuthiathode is a gram panchayat in Alappuzha district in the Indian state of Kerala.

Geography
The Kuthiathode or the river stream was once the major waterway for transporting goods to the local market from Kochi via the Vembanad lake.

History
The name Kuthiathode comes from Kuthia (dug)+ thode (canal) means a dug-canal.

The Panchayat has a Gandhi memorial inside its office dedicated to Mahathma Gandhi who visited this place during the Pre-Independence period.

Demographics
 India census, Kuthiathode had a population of 22,880 with 11,098 males and 11,782 females.

The population consists of Ezhavas, Nairs, Nampoothiris, Gouda Saraswat Brahmins, Tamil Brahmins, Pulayas, Kudumbis, Muslims, and Christians living harmoniously together.

Administration
Kuthiathode is under the Pattanakkad development block.

Kuthiathode, Vallethode, Parayakad, Nallukulanagara, Pallithode, Chapakadavu, Tirumalabhagom, Thazhuppu, Thuravoor North, and Valamangalam North are the local areas under the panchayat.

The panchayat office has a library and a community hall. The excise range office is next door. As well as the Kuthiathode village office, a Krishi Bhavan office, a government veterinary clinic, and a sub-treasury are also located in Kuthiathode. The BSNL telephone exchange is near the Kuthiathode Jamat mosque.

Kuthiathode is within the Aroor state assembly constituency.

Schools 
 Changaram Government Upper Primary School, Vallethode
 E.C.E.K. Union High School, Kuthiathode
 Government Primary School, Kodamthuruth
 Government Primary School, Tirumalabhagam
 Government Upper Primary School, Parayakadu
 St. Anthony's Primary school, Ezhupunna South
 St. Sebastian High School, Pallithode
 St. Thomas Lower Primary School, Pallithode
 Spring of Arts Academy
 T.D. Higher Secondary School
 V.V. Higher Secondary School, Kodamthuruth

Transportation
The village is well connected to the nearest towns by  NH-47, Thuravoor-Ezhupunna road and the Pallithode-Chellanam-Kochi beach road. The Alapuzha-Ernakulam Railway has a crossing station at Thuravoor.

Economy
The local market on both sides of the river was a major commercial hub around the locality. Even now the market exists with few wholesale traders selling vegetables and provisions. The vast agricultural lands on the western side or the Thuravoor Kari where large scale paddy cultivation and shrimp farming is done annually and serves as the seasonal livelihood for many of them. A large number of shrimp peeling sheds operating in this panchayat provides large scale employment.

Industrial Units 
 Steel and Heavy Industries Kerala Ltd.
 Higasimaru Feeds
 Veepack Industries

Tourism
The landscape of paddy fields on both sides of the Pallithode-Chavady road is really splendid. One can enjoy the evening panoramic view of Chinese fishing nets across the Pallithode backwaters from the Pallithode bridge. A small backwater lake at Tazzupu connects Kuthiathode with Valiathode.During Onam boat racing is held in Tazzupu backwaters and attracts many seasonal tourists.

Religious buildings

Hindu temples
 Chammanad Devi Temple
 Pattukulangara Devi Temple
 Amedathu kavu Devi temple
 Kuthiathode Vilanjoor Mahadeva Temple
 Chethikkatu Badrakalii kshethram, Kodamthuruth
 Kodamthuruthu Sreekrishna Temple (surya narayanapuram temple)
 Nalukulangara Devi Temple
 Nalikattu Subramanian Temple
 Kuthiathode Dharma Sastha temple
 Purantheraswaram Siva temple
 Thirumala Devasom - Sree Lakshmi Narasimha Temple
 Thirumala Devasom - Arthikulangara Devi Temple
 Thuravoor Thirumala Bhagom Sree Mahadeva Temple
 Pallithode Helapuram Devi Temple
 Pallithode Sree Krishnaswamy Temple
 Changaram Bhuvaneswari Temple, Vallethode
 Kelamkulangara Bhagavathi Temple

Mosques
 Rahmathul Islam Masjid, near KP Junction
 Ponnpuram Jamat Masjid- Chavady
 Masjid-Ul-Ansar - near North Railway cross
 Salafi Masjid, near petrol pump
 Thuravoor Jumua Masjid, near NCC Junction
 Kuthiathode Juma Masjid & Darul Uloom Madrasa

Churches
 Kodamthuruthu Fathima Matha Church
 St. Joseph Church, Kuthiathode
 St. Sebastein Church, Nalukulangara
 St. Monica's Church, Mariapuram, near railway station
 St. Sebastian Church, Pallithode
 St. Antony's Church, Chappakadavu

References

Villages in Alappuzha district